Benjamin Hart Yandell (16 March 1951, Pasadena – 25 August 2004, Pasadena) was an American author, known as the posthumous winner of the 2008 Euler Book Prize.

He graduated in 1973 with a bachelor's degree from Stanford University.

On 26 August 1974, he married Janet Alaine Nippell (born 1951), who was for some years on the editorial staff of the Los Angeles Times. They wrote a book about walks they took together in various neighborhoods of Los Angeles. Their book Mostly on Foot: A Year in L.A. was published in 1989.

After reading a biography of David Hilbert, Benjamin Yandell began studying the biographies of those mathematicians who did successful research on the 23 problems posed by Hilbert in 1900. After ten years of work, Yandell's completed his book “The Honors Class: Hilbert’s Problems and Their Solvers”, published in 2002.

Yandell's book is part of a huge literature on Hilbert's problems and is somewhat unusual in the emphasis it puts on the lives of mathematicians instead of the mathematics itself.

Upon his death he was survived by his wife and their daughter, Kate Louise Yandell (born 1988), who is a science writer dealing with biology.

References

1951 births
2004 deaths
Stanford University alumni
American historians of mathematics
Writers from Pasadena, California
20th-century American non-fiction writers